Iran participated in the 2013 Asian Indoor and Martial Arts Games in Incheon, South Korea from 29 June to 6 July 2013.

Competitors

Medal summary

Medal table

Medalists

Results by event

Board games

Chess

Men

Women

Mixed

Bowling

Men

Cue sports

Men

Women

Esports

Open

Futsal

Men

Women

Indoor kabaddi

Men

Women

Kurash

Men

Women

Muaythai

Men

Women

Short course swimming

Men

References

External links
 Official website 

Nations at the 2013 Asian Indoor and Martial Arts Games
Asian Indoor and Martial Arts Games
2013